The 2008 United States presidential election in Michigan took place on November 4, 2008. It was part of the 2008 United States presidential election which happened throughout all 50 states and D.C. Voters chose 17 representatives, or electors to the Electoral College, who voted for president and vice president.

Michigan was won by Democratic nominee Barack Obama by a 16.5% margin of victory. Early on, the state was heavily targeted as a swing state. However, Obama started to pull away in the polls during the last few months due to the worsening of the state's economy, causing McCain to stop campaigning there. Prior to the election, all 17 news organizations considered this a state Obama would win, or otherwise considered as a safe blue state. The Great Lakes State had leaned Democratic in recent decades, as it voted for the Democratic presidential nominee in every election since 1992. In the end, Obama won Michigan by a larger-than-expected margin of victory: 57.33% - 40.89%. With Obama winning the state by 823,275 votes, this is the highest Democratic margin of victory in Michigan since Lyndon B. Johnson in 1964, and the highest margin of victory for any presidential candidate since Ronald Reagan's landslide reelection in 1984. Obama won 46 of the 83 counties. As of 2020, this is the last time that Michigan voted to the left of New Jersey, Oregon, or New Mexico, and the last time a Democrat won the majority of Michigan's counties in a presidential election. Obama's 2,867,680 votes are the most received by a presidential candidate in the state's history.

Primaries
 2008 Michigan Democratic presidential primary
 2008 Michigan Republican presidential primary

Campaign

Predictions
There were 16 news organizations who made state-by-state predictions of the election. Here are their last predictions before election day:

Polling

Very early on, polling was tight as Obama was having a difficult time getting support from the pessimistic state. Since September 21, Obama swept all the polls taken from the state. The final 3 polls averaged Obama leading 54% to 40%.

Fundraising
John McCain raised a total of $4,330,872 in the state. Barack Obama raised $7,299,275.

Advertising and visits
Obama and his interest groups spent $12,995,614. McCain and his interest group spent $13,332,086. The Democratic ticket visited the state 10 times to McCain's 9 times.

Analysis
Michigan had not supported a Republican for president since 1988, and would not do so again until 2016. However, the state's 17 electoral votes had been continually a prime target for Republicans, and the Democratic margin of victory incrementally decreased from 1996 to 2004. In 2008, Republican presidential nominee John McCain put an early effort into winning Michigan, hoping to convert blue-collar voters disaffected by Obama's unfamiliarity as a liberal African-American from Chicago. Macomb County, a populous blue-collar suburb of Detroit, was a large target.

A major problem for the Obama campaign was the 2008 Michigan Democratic presidential primary. Obama removed his name from the ballot after state officials moved up the primary in violation of party rules.  As a result, Hillary Rodham Clinton won the state with 55%. This led to the McCain campaign focusing heavily on winning Michigan in the general election. In May 2008, McCain was leading in a Rasmussen poll with 45% to 44%. After the September financial crisis, however, McCain's general campaign fell into trouble. Polls showed Michigan, a state especially affected by the economy, turning away from McCain. Voters blamed Republicans for the crisis. In early October, with polls showing him falling further behind Obama, McCain pulled out of the state, essentially ceding it to Obama. This was widely publicized, and more than likely contributed to Obama's landslide victory.

On Election Day, Barack Obama won by a double-digit margin of 16%. The state was called for Obama almost as soon as the polls closed. In Wayne County, home to Detroit, Obama piled up a 3-1 margin. Democratic strongholds Washtenaw County (home to Ann Arbor and the University of Michigan), Ingham County (home to Lansing and Michigan State) and Genesee County (home to Flint) gave Obama 65-70% of the vote. Macomb County, which McCain had focused so intensely on, voted Democratic by a comfortable margin of 9%. Oakland County, once a bastion of suburban conservatism, went for Obama by 15 points. Obama also carried Kent County (home to Grand Rapids and former President Gerald Ford) by a very narrow 0.5% margin of victory, or 1,573 votes, the first time that a Democrat had done so since Lyndon B. Johnson in 1964. Republican support in the state collapsed; McCain was only able to win two counties with margins of more than 10,000 votes.  This result signified continued evidence of Michigan's Democratic tilt, anchored by the heavily Democratic cities of Detroit, Lansing, Ann Arbor, and Flint.

Barack Obama won 46 Michigan counties compared to 37 for John McCain. The largest county with a very close winning margin was a 49.3% vs. 48.8% plurality for Obama in Kent County.

At the same time as Obama swept the state, Democrats made more gains in Michigan. Incumbent Democratic U.S. Senator Carl Levin was reelected with 62.65% of the vote over Republican Jack Hoogendyk's 33.84%. Democrats also picked up two U.S. House seats in Michigan in the 7th District and the 9th District, with Mark Schauer and Gary Peters knocking off Tim Walberg and Joe Knollenberg, respectively. This gave Democrats the majority in Michigan's U.S. House delegation. In addition, Democrats picked up nine seats in the Michigan House of Representatives.

, this is the last election in which Alger County, Alpena County, Arenac County, Benzie County, 
Berrien County, Cass County, Clare County, Clinton County, Delta County, Gladwin County, Gratiot County, Iosco County, Iron County, Jackson County, Lenawee County, Mason County, Menominee County, Oceana County, Ogemaw County, Ontonagon County, Presque Isle County, Roscommon County, Schoolcraft County, and St. Clair County voted for the Democratic candidate. This is also the last presidential election in which the Democratic candidate won the Upper Peninsula.

Results

By county

Counties that flipped from Republican to Democratic
 Alpena (largest city: Alpena)
 Benzie (largest city: Frankfort)
 Berrien (largest city: Niles)
 Cass (largest city: Dowagiac)
 Calhoun (largest city: Marshall)
 Clare (largest city: Clare)
 Clinton (largest city: St. Johns)
 Delta (largest city: Escanaba)
 Eaton (largest city: Charlotte)
 Gladwin (largest city: Gladwin)
 Gratiot (largest city: Alma)
 Iosco (largest city: East Tawas)
 Iron (largest city: Iron River)
 Jackson (largest city: Jackson)
 Kent (largest city: Grand Rapids)
 Leelanau (largest settlement: Greilickville)
 Lenawee (largest city: Adrian)
 Macomb (largest city: Warren)
 Mason (largest city: Ludington)
 Manistee (largest city: Manistee)
 Menominee (largest city: Menominee)
 Monroe (largest city: Monroe)
 Oceana (largest city: Hart)
 Ogemaw (largest city: West Branch)
 Ontonagon (largest village: Ontonagon)
 Presque Isle (largest city: Rogers City)
 Roscommon (largest settlement: Houghton Lake)
 Schoolcraft (largest city: Manistique)
 Shiawassee (largest city: Owosso)
 St. Clair (largest city: Port Huron)
 Van Buren (largest city: South Haven)

By congressional district
Barack Obama carried 12 of the 15 congressional districts in Michigan, including three districts held by Republicans.

Electors

Technically the voters of Michigan cast their ballots for electors: representatives to the Electoral College. Michigan is allocated 17 electors because it has 15 congressional districts and 2 senators. All candidates who appear on the ballot or qualify to receive write-in votes must submit a list of 17 electors, who pledge to vote for their candidate and his or her running mate. Whoever wins the majority of votes in the state is awarded all 17 electoral votes. Their chosen electors then vote for president and vice president. Although electors are pledged to their candidate and running mate, they are not obligated to vote for them. An elector who votes for someone other than his or her candidate is known as a faithless elector.

The electors of each state and the District of Columbia met on December 15, 2008, to cast their votes for president and vice president. The Electoral College itself never meets as one body. Instead the electors from each state and the District of Columbia met in their respective capitols.

The following were the members of the Electoral College from the state. All 17 were pledged to Obama and Biden:
Brenda Abbey
Dallas Dean
Ida DeHaas
Ron Gettelfinger
James Hoffa
Kenneth Paul Jenkins
Harry Kalogerakos
Jessica Mistak
Arturo Reyes
Griffin Rivers
Gary Shepherd
Roger Short
Arthur Shy
Richard West
Whitney Randall Wolcott
David Woodward
Charlene Yarbrough

See also
 Presidency of Barack Obama
 United States presidential elections in Michigan

References

Michigan
2008 Michigan elections
2008